Mianyang Nanhe Sports Centre Stadium (绵阳南河体育中心体育场) is a multi-purpose stadium in Mianyang, China.  Located in Fucheng District, It is currently used mostly for football matches.  The stadium holds 30,000 spectators.

References

Football venues in China
Multi-purpose stadiums in China
Sports venues in Sichuan